Dancing is a 1933 Argentine musical film directed by Luis Moglia Barth for Argentina Sono Film.
The film's sets were designed by the art director Juan Manuel Concado.
It is based on a play by Alejandro Berrutti. It was the second ever sound film to be released by the studio after Barth's ¡Tango!, released earlier in 1933, it marked the debut of Amelia Bence, who had a minor role.

Cast
 Arturo García Buhr 
 Amanda Ledesma 
 Alicia Vignoli 
 Tito Lusiardo 
 Alicia Barrié
 Severo Fernández 
 Pedro Quartucci
 Héctor Calcaño
 Héctor Quintanilla 
 Eduardo Sandrini 
 Margarita Padín 
 Domingo Mania
 Paquita Garzón
 Rosa Catá
 Amelia Bence 
 Elena Zucotti 
 René Cóspito
 Roberto Firpo 
 Los de la Raza
 Arturo Bamio

References

Bibliography
 Rist, Peter H. Historical Dictionary of South American Cinema. Rowman & Littlefield, 2014.

External links
 

1933 films
1933 musical films
1930s Spanish-language films
Argentine musical films
Films directed by Luis Moglia Barth
American black-and-white films
1930s Argentine films